Hamurkesen can refer to:

 Hamurkesen, Karakoçan
 Hamurkesen, Van